Aaron Slick from Punkin Crick (also known as Marshmallow Moon in the U.K. and the Philippines and Härkiä, heiniä ja hakkailua in Finland) is a 1952 Paramount Pictures hillbilly musical film directed by Claude Binyon and produced by William Perlberg and George Seaton. It is based on a popular 1919 play by Walter Benjamin Hare  which was one of the most produced plays in the history of American theater with 40,000 performances, as of 1952, mainly by amateur groups. The film's cinematographer was Charles Lang and its costumes were designed by Edith Head.

Plot
A dreamy farm widow is obsessed with moving to the city. She is courted by her shy bumpkin neighbor Aaron Slick. She is nearly tricked out of her oil-rich land by crooks.

Cast
The film stars Alan Young, Dinah Shore and Robert Merrill. It was Young's first starring role after three supporting roles in the 1940s. Shore had not acted on screen since 1944's Belle of the Yukon, and Aaron Slick from Punkin Crick would be her last major film role. The film also marked opera star Merrill's screen debut.
Alan Young as Aaron Slick 
Dinah Shore as Josie Berry 
Robert Merrill as Bill Merridew 
Adele Jergens as Gladys 
Minerva Urecal as Mrs. Peabody 
Martha Stewart as Soubrette 
Fritz Feld as Headwaiter 
Veda Ann Borg as Girl in Red 
Chick Chandler as Pitchman

Reception
Though produced in Technicolor as an A production, Aaron Slick from Punkin Crick fared poorly at the box office and was relegated to B movie status.

Bosley Crowther of The New York Times wrote in his April 19, 1952 review: "Claude Binyon, who wrote and directed, must have done so in a stultifying trance; not a trace of his well-known wit or drollery is evident in this film. And the songs, which are woodenly delivered by Miss Shore, Mr. Young and Robert Merrill, who plays the city rascal, are hard to remember as far as the door."

Variety was lukewarm, reporting: "The bucolic humor presented is of a mild brand, the music score that has been added to the original play is fair, and while the performances are competent its chances in the general market are spotty."

Harrison's Reports wrote that the film should give "... fairly good satisfaction to the general run of audiences, although it will probably find its best reception in the smaller towns and cities."

John McCarten of The New Yorker wrote: "Every cliché of musical barnyard drama is included here, and the song lyrics run to such idiocies as 'Purt Nigh but Not Plumb.' Associated with Mr. Merrill in this hayshaking enterprise are Alan Young and Dinah Shore. They'll make you long for the streets outside."

English film historian and critic Leslie Halliwell considered Aaron Slick from Punkin Crick to be "[h]omespun entertainment based on a staple success of the American provincial theatre, with pleasant songs added."

Soundtrack
All songs written by Jay Livingston and Ray Evans:
"Chores"
"My Beloved"
"Marshmallow Moon"
"Why Should I Believe In Love?"
"Still Water"
"Purt' Nigh, But Not Plumb"
"Life Is a Beautiful Thing"
"I'd Like To Baby You"
"Saturday Night in Punkin Creek"
"Step Right Up"
"Soda Shop"
"Marshmallow Moon" was a hit before the film was released.

References

External links
 

1952 musical films
1952 films
Films directed by Claude Binyon
Paramount Pictures films
American films based on plays
American musical films
Films produced by William Perlberg
Films produced by George Seaton
1950s English-language films
1950s American films